Honky Tonk is the seventh studio album by the band Son Volt. It was released March 5, 2013.

Track listing

Personnel 
 Jay Farrar - vocals, acoustic guitar, harmonica
 Thayne Bradford - accordion
 Mark Spencer - bass, pedal steel guitar, electric guitar
 Dave Bryson - drums, percussion
 Justin Branum - fiddle
 Gary Hunt - fiddle, mandolin, electric guitar
 Brad Sarno - pedal steel guitar
 Mark Spencer - recorded by

References

External links 
 Son Volt official Site

2013 albums
Son Volt albums
Rounder Records albums